A clapper stick (also clap-stick or split stick rattle) is a traditional idiophone common among the indigenous peoples of California. It is traditionally constructed by cutting the branch of an elderberry tree, hollowing it out, and partially splitting the branch in two. It is used to keep time and accompany singers and dancers. Many are now made of bamboo, which do not require hollowing.

Names in indigenous California languages 

 Central Sierra Miwok: țakáț'a
 Chukchansi: tá-wit
 Chumash: wansak
 Hupa: kinah¬dun-ts’e:y’
 Maidu: pak'papa
 Mutsun: sallik
 Northern Paiute: hau tsavaiya
 Northern Pomo: hay bit’abit’aka
 Plains Miwok: taka'tta
 Serrano: pă-how-it
 Tongva: araawkewe
 Tubatulabal: ka*ba.ba.ynis't 
 Western Mono: anawataki'inu
 Wintu: lasasus
 Yuki: al-lah-chi'-mah

See also 
 Clapper
 Clapstick
 Indigenous music of North America

References 

Stick concussion idiophones
Native American music
Music of California
American Indian musical instruments